Joey Lye (born May 4, 1987) is a Canadian softball player.

Career
Lye has competed at three Pan American Games. At the 2011 Pan American Games, Lye won silver. At the 2015 Pan American Games in Toronto, she won the gold medal, and again at the 2019 Pan American Games in Lima, winning silver. 

She was the head softball coach at Bucknell from 2018 to 2020 before stepping down to pursue her Olympic dream.

In June 2021, Lye was named to Canada's 2020 Olympic team. She is openly lesbian.

References

1992 births
Canadian softball players
Living people
Sportspeople from Toronto
Softball players at the 2011 Pan American Games
Softball players at the 2015 Pan American Games
Softball players at the 2019 Pan American Games
Medalists at the 2011 Pan American Games
Medalists at the 2015 Pan American Games
Medalists at the 2019 Pan American Games
Pan American Games gold medalists for Canada
Pan American Games silver medalists for Canada
Softball players at the 2020 Summer Olympics
Olympic softball players of Canada
Medalists at the 2020 Summer Olympics
Olympic bronze medalists for Canada
Olympic medalists in softball
Canadian LGBT sportspeople
LGBT softball players
Pan American Games medalists in softball